Eric S. Hatch (October 31, 1901 - July 4, 1973) was an American writer on the staff of The New Yorker and a novelist and screenwriter  best known for his books 1101 Park Avenue, (which became a hit film in 1936 under the title  My Man Godfrey) and The Year of the Horse (which was adapted as a Disney comedy with the title, The Horse in the Gray Flannel Suit).

Biography

Born in New York City, Eric was the son of May D. Hatch and her husband Frederic H. Hatch, owner of a successful Wall Street stock brokerage firm he founded in 1888. Eric was the younger brother of biographer, Alden Hatch.

Boucher and McComas praised his 1950 fantasy The Beautiful Bequest, saying it had "the zestful appeal of a good novel from the lamented Unknown."

Eric Hatch died in Torrington, Connecticut at age seventy-one.

Bibliography
 A Couple of Quick Ones, 1928
 Romance Prescribed, 1930
 Lover's Loot, 1931
 Five Days, 1933
 Road Show, 1934
 Fly By Night, 1935
 My Man Godfrey, 1935
 Good Old Jack, 1937
 Unexpected Uncle, 1941
 Words and Music, 1943
 The Unexpected Warrior, 1947 
 The Beautiful Bequest, 1950
 Crockett's Women, 1951
 The Golden Woman, 1952
 A Guide to Historic Sites in Connecticut, 1963 
 The Judge and the Junior Exhibitor, 1964
 The Little Book of Bells, 1964
 The Year of the Horse, 1965
 The Colonel's Ladies, 1968
 Two and Two is Six, 1969
 What Goes on in Horses' Heads, 1970

Screenplays 
 1931: Sidewalks of New York
 1936: My Man Godfrey
 1937: Topper
 1957: My Man Godfrey
 1968: The Horse in the Grey Flannel Suit

References

External links
 

1901 births
1973 deaths
20th-century American novelists
American male novelists
American male screenwriters
Writers from New York City
20th-century American male writers
Novelists from New York (state)
Screenwriters from New York (state)
20th-century American screenwriters